The 2008 Rally Catalunya, officially 44è Rally RACC Catalunya - Costa Daurada, was the 44th Rally Catalunya and the 12th round of the 2008 World Rally Championship season. The rally took place during October 2–5, 2008 and consisted of 18 special stages.

The rally was won by Citroën Total World Rally Team's Sébastien Loeb ahead of his teammate Dani Sordo. This was Citroën's third double win in a row, after previous one-two finishes in Germany and New Zealand. BP Ford World Rally Team's Mikko Hirvonen and François Duval took comfortable third and fourth positions, although only battled with each other and never managed to challenge the Citroëns. Duval eased off in one stage to let Hirvonen, who continued his fight for the drivers' title with Loeb, to take the third place and one extra point.

Subaru World Rally Team's Petter Solberg fought for fifth place with Urmo Aava until the penultimate stage, when Aava retired after making a mistake and breaking his Citroën C4 WRC's suspension. The battle for sixth place went down to the wire, with Stobart M-Sport Ford's Jari-Matti Latvala edging out Subaru's Chris Atkinson by 1.1 seconds. Andreas Mikkelsen drove his privateer Ford Focus RS WRC 07 to eighth place, taking the second points finish of his career.

Results

Championship standings after the event

Drivers' championship

Manufacturers' championship

External links 

 Standings at eWRC

Catalunya
2008
Catalunya Rally